Salicyl alcohol (saligenin) is an organic compound with the formula C6H4(OH)(CH2OH).  It is a white solid that is used as a precursor in organic synthesis.

Chemical synthesis

Salicyl alcohol can be prepared through the reduction of salicylaldehyde via lithium aluminium hydride (LAH) in THF.

Applications
Chemical sweeteners were formed by acetal formation with e.g. isovanillin (Cmp4).

Salicyl alcohol appears as a pharmacophore in several notable β2-adrenoceptor agonists (e.g. salbutamol), as well as in synthetic estrone analogs, e.g. CID:22940780 or CID:154236944.

Biosynthesis
Salicyl alcohol is the precursor of salicylic acid. It is formed from salicin by enzymatic hydrolysis by Salicyl-alcohol beta-D-glucosyltransferase or by acid hydrolysis.

See also
Gastrodigenin (4-hydroxybenzyl alcohol)
Discovery and development of beta2 agonists

References 

Primary alcohols
Phenols